Samuel Phillips (February 17, 1690 – June 5, 1771) was an American Congregational minister and the first pastor of the South Church in Andover, Massachusetts. His son, John Phillips, was the founder of Phillips Exeter Academy, and his grandson, Samuel Phillips Jr., was the founder of Phillips Academy Andover and briefly the lieutenant governor of Massachusetts.

Early life 
Samuel Phillips was born in Salem, Massachusetts on February 17, 1690.  Phillips was the second eldest child and eldest son of Samuel Phillips and Mary Emerson and one of eight siblings, including one half-sister:
 Patience died young.
 Sarah (January 28, 1692 – 1737) married William White, of Haverhill, in Boston June 12, 1716.  Before her marriage, she was probably living with a relative or friend in Boston as she was living with her father Samuel Phillips of Salem.  They had eleven children.
 Mary (August 5, 1694 – October 5, 1785) married Capt. George Abbot, of Andover, in Salem November 29, 1721.
 Ruth (September 4, 1696 – ?) married Samuel White, of Haverhill, in 1718 or April 21, 1724, in Ipswich according to the Hamlet Parish Church record, now a part of Hamilton, Massachusetts.  They had seven children.
 Elizabeth (March 5, 1699 – August 7, 1700) died young.
 John (June 22, 1701 – April 19, 1768) was a Boston merchant, bookseller and publisher, deacon of the Brattle Street Church, colonel of the Boston Regiment, and a Justice of the Peace and of the Quorum.  He is the grandfather of John Phillips, first mayor of Boston, great-grandfather of Wendell Phillips.  He married Mary Buttolph (May 8, 1703 – August 15, 1742) on November 21, 1723, and after she died Abigail Webb of Fairfield, Connecticut. 
Child with second wife Sarah Mayfield, married April 27, 1704:
 Patience (August 8, 1706 – November 14, 1773) married Rev. David Jewett of New London, Connecticut, and had two children.  She met Jewitt while he was a theology student at Harvard.  Jewitt was ill and she helped bring him back to good health.  She also, according to parish records in New London, was born with one hand, but was still able to perform most of the tasks those with two could.
His grandfather was Rev. Samuel Phillips of Rowley and his great-grandfather George Phillips of Watertown, one of the first to settle in Watertown and founder of its First Congregational Church.

Phillips was admitted to Harvard College in July 1704 and graduated in 1708.  After about a year of teaching in Chebacco (formerly a parish of Ipswich and currently Essex), Massachusetts, he became more focused on preparing for the ministry.

Ministry 

Phillips preached in Norton for a short period of time.  He had the respect of the parish and was asked to relocate and begin preaching with its new church.  He was not ordained however: "The influence of the minister of the old Parish of Taunton was unfavorable." 

In 1710 Phillips came to Andover to serve as the pastor of the newly founded South Church.  He began preaching on April 30 of that year.  On December 12 the Parish voted unanimously in his favor.  He declined, however, to officially take on the role immediately after his approval due to his young age.  On October 17, 1711, the day of the official organization of the church and at the age of 22, Phillips was ordained as the first pastor of the South Church. He "preached the [first] Sermon himself, from Ezek. 3:17."

While pastor he published a number of works, many of which were written for members of the parish to take as guidance.  He preached an Artillery Sermon, an Election Sermon, and a Convention Sermon, suggesting he was highly esteemed.  Reverend John Webb, in the preface of Advice to A Child, writes of Phillips:
"The discourses he has published heretofore, have given him this testimony in the consciences of all good Christians who have read them.  That he is a well-qualified and faithful minister of Jesus Christ."
Phillips had at least two African American servants, Salem and Rama.  After Phillips died, they became servants of Rev. Jonathan French, the next pastor.  They had a child named Cyrus (baptized December 23, 1770) and another Titus (b. November 24, 1774).

Phillips remained pastor of the church until his death on June 5, 1771, serving nearly sixty years.  Jonathan French succeeded him as second pastor.

Marriage and children 
Phillips married Hannah White (1691 – January 7, 1773) of Haverhill, daughter of John White of Haverhill and Lydia Gilman on January 17, 1712.  Together they had five children:
 Mary (November 30, 1712 – November 24, 1737) married Samuel Appleton (a distant cousin), of Haverhill, on October 12, 1736.  She died in childbed at the age of 24, her only child still-born.
 Samuel (February 13, 1715 – August 21, 1790) was a teacher, businessman, a deacon of South Church, a Representative to the General Court and the Convention of Deputies, and a member of the Governor's Council.  He graduated from Harvard University in 1734.  He was a founder of Phillips Academy along with his brother John Phillips (see below) and especially his son Judge Samuel Phillips and President of its Board of Trustees from 1778–1790.
 Lydia (June 10, 1717 – November 4, 1749) married Dr. Parker Clark, of Newbury, on May 18, 1742.  They had four children.
 John (December 17, 1719 – April 21, 1795) was a teacher, merchant, judge, and trustee of Dartmouth College.  He graduated from Harvard University in 1735.  He is also a founder of Phillips Academy and sole founder of Phillips Exeter Academy.
 William (June 25, 1722 – January 15, 1804) was a merchant, representative, senator, member of the Constitutional Convention, deacon of the Old South Church in Boston, and trustee of Phillips Academy.
Hannah died on January 7, 1773, at the age of 82.

Death and legacy
Phillips died on June 5, 1771.  Over the course of his ministry, he baptised 2143 people including 30 adults and witnessed the parish grow from 35 in 1711 to 573.  He is the longest-serving pastor of the church to date.  He is buried in the South Church Cemetery, Andover, Massachusetts along with other members of the Phillips family.

Publications 
Phillips wrote a number of publications over his lifetime covering a variety of subjects.  The following is a complete list of his works:

Notes

References

Bibliography

External links 
 South Church, Andover, MA: official website
 Phillips family tree
 

1690 births
1771 deaths
People of colonial Massachusetts
Phillips family (New England)
Harvard College alumni
People from Salem, Massachusetts
People from Andover, Massachusetts
Protestant religious leaders